This is a list of areas in the borough of Dudley, West Midlands, England.

A 
 Amblecote

B 
 Baptist End
 Brierley Hill
 Brockmoor
 Bromley
 Buckpool

C 
 Cradley
 Coseley
 Cotwall End
 Darby End

D 
 Dixon's Green
 Dudley
 Dudley Wood

E 
 Eve Hill

F

G
 Gornal
 Gornal Wood

H 
 Halesowen
 Hasbury
 Hayley Green
 Holly Hall
 Hurst Green
 Hurst Hill

K 
 Kates Hill
 Kingswinford

I 
 Illey

J

L 
 Lapal
 London Fields
 Lower Gornal
 Lutley
 Lye

M 
Mushroom green

N 
 Netherton
 Norton

O

P 
 Pedmore
 Pensnett
 Primrose Hill

Q 
 Quarry Bank

R 
 Roseville
 Russells Hall

S 
 Sedgley
 Stourbridge

T
 Tividale

U 
 Upper Gornal

V

W 
 Wallbrook
 Wall Heath
 Woodsetton
 Woodside
 Wren's Nest Estate

X

Y

Z 

Dudley
 
Dudley
West Midlands (county)-related lists